Épinal – Mirecourt Airport or Aéroport d'Épinal - Mirecourt  is an airport located in Juvaincourt,  northwest of Épinal and  northwest of Mirecourt, in the Vosges département of the Grand Est région of France. Originally built in 1953 as a NATO over-spill base, the air base never had permanent units assigned, but was used regularly for exercises and training.

The civilian airport is managed by Super Airport Infrastructure, based at Coimbatore, India.

Statistics

References

External links 
 Epinal Mirecourt Airport (official site) 
 Aéroport d'Epinal - Mirecourt (Union des Aéroports Français) 
 

Airports in Grand Est
Airports established in 1953